The 1916–17 United States collegiate men's ice hockey season was the 23rd season of collegiate ice hockey.

Regular season

Standings

References

1916–17 NCAA Standings

External links
College Hockey Historical Archives

 
College